The dessert known in most of Spain as crema catalana ("Catalan cream"), but as crema quemada ("burnt cream") in Catalan cuisine, is  similar to a crème brûlée; the desserts have been called "virtually identical", although crema catalana is made with milk, while crème brûlée is made with cream. Crema catalana is a custard made from egg yolks, milk, sugar, cornflour (in modern recipes), and aromatics, typically lemon zest, cinnamon, or vanilla, with a crisp caramel crust.

Recipe
Some differences between crema catalana and crème brûlée include the cooking method and the resulting consistency; the French version is made with cream (that contains 30 to 36 percent of fat) and flavoured  with vanilla, while the Catalan version is made with milk ( whole milk has an average of 3.5 percent fat), and typically flavoured with cinnamon and lemon zest. Modern versions are often thickened with cornflour. 

Crema catalana cannot be frozen successfully.

History
The first known recipe for crema catalana appears in the Catalan cookbooks Llibre de Sent Soví (14th century) and Llibre del Coch (16th century). The first of these was published three centuries before recipes for the French crème brûlée. The recipe included a custard cream, over which sugar was poured and subsequently burnt with a hot iron rod, creating the characteristic burnt crust.

Analogous recipes appear in 17th century Spanish cookery books, usually under the name of Cream of Saint Joseph ("Crema de Sant Josep"), since it was a traditional dessert served during Saint Joseph's Day, although nowadays it is consumed at all times of the year. The recipe was first referred to as crema catalana (Catalan cream) in the 1745 cookbook by the Spanish friar Juan de Altamiras, where the recipe was said to be of Catalan origin. The burnt sugar topping is documented in 1770.

See also
 Mató de Pedralbes

References

External links
How to make crema catalana (video)
Crema catalana Recipe

Catalan cuisine
Custard desserts
Spanish desserts